Mawhpung Bum or Mawhpungbum is a conspicuous mountain of the Sagaing Region, Burma. It is located near the border with Kachin State.

See also
List of mountains in Burma
List of Ultras of Southeast Asia

References

External links

Google Books, The Physical Geography of Southeast Asia

Sagaing Region
Mountains of Myanmar